A Luther Monument is a monument dedicated to the reformer Martin Luther. The oldest one from 1821 is in Wittenberg. The largest one, the Luther Monument in Worms, was unveiled in 1868 as a composition of several statues, designed by Ernst Rietschel. Several monuments in the United States use a copy of Rietschel's main statue, including the Luther Monument in Washington, D.C., from 1884.

History 
Monuments for Luther were mainly erected in the second half of the 19th century. In several German towns, the served as memorials for the Reformation which Luther initiated. They often connect to events in the reformer's life, sometimes a visit in the town. It was designed by Johann Gottfried Schadow and unveiled in 1821.

The largest monument was designed by Ernst Rietschel, and unveiled in Worms in 1868. Several statues with Luther in the centre are arranged in the shape of a castle, reminiscent of Luther's hymn "Ein feste Burg ist unser Gott" ("A Mighty Fortress Is Our God"). It influenced the design of other monuments. The central figure was copied several times, including seven replicas in the United States.

Monuments in Europe 

 in Annaberg-Buchholz (1883)
 in Aš, Bohemia (1883)
  in Bad Schandau (1817)
 on the Friedhof der Dorotheenstädtischen und Friedrichswerderschen Gemeinden in Berlin (1909), copy of the Wittenberg monument
  in Bielsko-Biała, Poland (1900) at the Lutherkirche, by 
 in Coburg (1883) in the Lutherschule, probably after Rietschel
 in Cottbus (1911) in front of the Niedersorbisches Gymnasium, by Heinrich Goetschmann
 in Dresden (1885) at the Frauenkirche, by Adolf von Donndorf after Rietschel
 in Elze (1883)
  in Eisenach (1885) by Adolf von Donndorf
 in Eisleben (1883) on the market square, by Rudolf Siemering
  in Erfurt (1889), by Fritz Schaper
 in Hamburg (1912) at the Micheliskirche, by Otto Lessing
 in Kirchberg (1908) in the Lutherpark, copy after Rietschel
  in Möhra (1861) by 
  on Norderney (1883), by Bernhard Högl
 in Nürnberg at the St. Sebald, with Phillipp Melanchthon
 in Speyer (1903) at the Gedächtniskirche der Protestation, by Hermann Hahn
  near Steinbach (Bad Liebenstein) (1857) 
 in Uelzen (1883) after Rietschel
 in Wennigsen (Deister), Lower Saxony (1960), copy of Springfield, Illinois
  in Wittenberg (1821) on the market square, by Johann Gottfried Schadow
 Luther Monument in Worms (1868), by Ernst Rietschel

Monuments in other continents 

 in Nova Friburgo, Brazil (2004) by Otavio Teixeira M. Neto
 in Santiago de Chile, Chile (2002) by Serena Piacentini, first Luther Monument in Spanish-speaking Latin America
 in front of the Lutherkirche in Copenhagen, Dänemark (1983) by Rikard Magnussen
  in Keila, Estonia (1862–1949)
 in Edmonton, Alberta, Canada (1987) on the Augustana Campus of the University of Alberta, by Danek Mozdzenski
 in Baltimore, Maryland, U.S. (1936) by Hans Schuler
 in Clayton, Missouri, U.S. (1904) on the campus of the Concordia Seminary, copy after Rietschel
 Martin Luther at Worms in Decorah, Iowa, U.S. (1911) on the campus of the Luther College, copy after Rietschel
 in Dubuque, Iowa, U.S. (1921) on the campus of the Wartburg Theological Seminary, copy after Rietschel
 in Fort Wayne, Indiana, U.S. (1957) on the campus of the Concordia Theological Seminary, by 
 in Gettysburg, Pennsylvania, U.S. (1947) on the campus of the Lutheran Theological Seminary, by Hans Schuler
 Luther at 38 in Louisville, Kentucky, U.S. (1960) in front of the First Lutheran Church, copy after the one in Fort Wayne
 in Mount Clemens, Michigan, U. S. (1930) at the Cadillac Memorial Gardens, copy after Rietschel
 in Seguin, Texas, U.S. (1976) on the campus of the Texas Lutheran College, by Elmer Petersen
 Martin Luther the Teacher, Martin Luther the Musician in Springfield, Ohio, U.S. (1956) on the Campus of the Wittenberg University, by A. Regis Milione
 in St. Paul, Minnesota, U.S. (1921) on the campus of the Concordia College, copy after Rietschel
 in Austin. Texas. U.S. (2000) on the campus of Concordia University Texas, by Eloiese Krabbenhoft, Professor at Texas State University, San Marcus, Texas. Using measurements and Cranach portraits from the Wittenberg Luther Museum's curator, Martin Treu, Krabbenhoeft employed forensic technology to create a Luther from 1501, the age of an entering freshman at Concordia.  
 in Streator, Illinois, U.S. (1935) in the Hillcrest Memorial Park, copy after Rietschel
 Luther Monument in Washington, D.C., U.S (1884), copy after Rietschel
 in New Ulm, Minnesota at Martin Luther College
 in Mequon, Wisconsin at Wisconsin Lutheran Seminary 
 in Mequon, Wisconsin at Concordia University Wisconsin

References

Literature 
 Otto Kammer: Reformationsdenkmäler des 19. und 20. Jahrhunderts: Eine Bestandsaufnahme. Evangelische Verlagsanstalt, Leipzig 2004, .
 Christiane Theiselmann: Das Wormser Lutherdenkmal Ernst Rietschels (1856–1868) im Rahmen der Lutherrezeption des 19. Jahrhunderts. Europäische Hochschulschriften, Frankfurt am Main 1992, .
 Familienblatt der Lutheriden-Vereinigung, 3. Band, Heft 5, 13. Jahrgang, Februar 1939. Digitalisat (PDF).

External links 

Monuments and memorials in Germany
Cultural depictions of Martin Luther
Statues of religious leaders
Sculptures of men
Outdoor sculptures